Once in the Life is a 2000 American direct-to-video crime film written , directed and starring Laurence Fishburne. He adapted the script from his own play, Riff Raff.

Plot 
Once you're in the life of drug dealing and organized crime, can you get out? During a brief jail stay two half-brothers, who had rarely seen each other while growing up begin to connect. One of them is 20/20 Mike, a name given because he can sense people nearby, who concocts a scheme in which him and his brother Billy will steal drugs from young couriers. The heist goes awry when the junkie brother, Billy, shoots the victims of the theft. The brothers hole up in an abandoned building, and 20/20 Mike seeks help from an old cellmate, Tony, who he thinks is out of the life of organized crime. It turns out that they have stolen Tony's dope—and Tony's boss wants the two thieves dead. "Is there any way out?"

Cast 
 Laurence Fishburne – 20/20 Mike
 Titus Welliver – Torch
 Eamonn Walker – Tony
 Gregory Hines – Ruffhouse
 Michael Paul Chan – Buddha
 Annabella Sciorra – Maxine
 Paul Calderón – Manny Rivera
 Andres Titus – Hector (as Andres 'Dres' Titus)
 Madison Riley – Precious

Production 
Once in the Life was the directorial debut of Laurence Fishburne, and adapted from his own 1994 play Riff Raff. Much of the film was shot in the Hotel Rivieria in Newark, New Jersey.

Reception 
The review aggregator website Rotten Tomatoes reported a 28% approval rating based on 25 reviews, and an average rating of 4.7/10. The site's critical consensus reads, "Once in a Life is a promising directorial effort by Laurence Fishburne. But the story is too conventional and similar to the many ghetto action/dramas that come before it."

References

External links 
 

2000 films
2000 crime drama films
2000s heist films
American crime drama films
American heist films
American films based on plays
Films directed by Laurence Fishburne
Films shot in New Jersey
2000 directorial debut films
2000s English-language films
2000s American films